Nantong Zhiyun Football Club is a professional Chinese football club that currently participates in the Chinese Super League division under licence from the Chinese Football Association (CFA). The team is based in Nantong, Jiangsu and their home stadium is the 15,000 capacity Rugao Olympic Sports Center. The club was founded on 13 March 2016 by Fan Bing with the support from the Rugao, Nantong and Jiangsu Province Municipal Government.

History
The club was formed when the Nantong Municipal Football Association bought the first team of Guangxi Longguida F.C. as well as their registration and position in the Chinese Football Association China League Two division. Nantong Zhiyun F.C. was officially established on March 13, 2016 in a launching ceremony held in Rugao, Nantong in the Jiangsu province where the Chairman Fan Bing, with the support from the Rugao, Nantong and Jiangsu Province Municipal Government, announced that the club was named after the Zhiyun Pagoda situated on the top of the Langshan hill overlooking the city of Nantong. The club's badge would utilise a wolf as reference to Langshan hill's history with wolves while blue was chosen as the team's home colours. Former Chinese referee Li Jun was appointed as the club's general manager and former Chinese international Wei Xin as the club's Head Coach.

In the 2018 China League Two season, they gained promotion to the China League One for the first time in its history after beating Shaanxi Chang'an Athletic 1–0 at Shaanxi Province Stadium in front of 48,869 spectators on October 27, with a last minute goal by Nan Yunqi sealing the game. With that victory the club were able to gain investment after several shareholders left the club while they were in the third tier. In the second tier the club would struggle and Wei Xin was replaced with Gary White as Head Coach on 20 August 2019, who ensured the clubs survival within the division. On 31 March 2020, Xie Hui was brought in as the new Head Coach, however his vocal behaviour and critical options, particularly on the President of the Chinese Football Association, Chen Xuyuan saw him resign. On 26 August 2021, Cao Rui would be brought in to manage the team and he would go on to lead the team to third within the division and promotion to the top tier at the end of the 2022 China League One season.

Name history
2016– Nantong Zhiyun F.C. 南通支云

Players

Current squad

Coaching staff

Managerial history
  Wei Xin  (2016)
  Tomislav Stipić (2017)
  Wei Xin (2017–2019)
  Gary White (2019–2020)
  Xie Hui (2020–2021)
  Cao Rui (2021–2022)
  David Patricio (2023-)

Results
All-time league rankings

As of the end of 2019 season.

 in group stage.

Key
 Pld = Played
 W = Games won
 D = Games drawn
 L = Games lost
 F = Goals for
 A = Goals against
 Pts = Points
 Pos = Final position

 DNQ = Did Not Qualify
 DNE = Did Not Enter
 NH = Not Held
 – = Does Not Exist
 R1 = Round 1
 R2 = Round 2
 R3 = Round 3
 R4 = Round 4

 F = Final
 SF = Semi-finals
 QF = Quarter-finals
 R16 = Round of 16
 Group = Group stage
 GS2 = Second Group stage
 QR1 = First Qualifying Round
 QR2 = Second Qualifying Round
 QR3 = Third Qualifying Round

References

External links
 Official website 

 
Football clubs in China
Association football clubs established in 2016
2016 establishments in China
Sport in Jiangsu